Wal is a male given name and nickname. It is the Australian diminutive for Walter, Wallace, and Wally.

People using this name include:

Persons

Sportspeople
 Wally Carr (1954–2019; aka Wal Carr), Aboriginal Australian professional boxer
 Wal Chisholm (1915–2005), Newzealander-Australian athlete
 Wal Fall (born 1992), German soccer player
 Wal Handley (1902–1941), British motorcycle racer
 Wal Ives (1906–1983), Australian rugby union footballer
 Wal Lambert (1916–1993), Australian rower
 Wal Mackney (1905–1975), Australian rugger and rower
 Wal Phillips (1908–1998), British motorcycle racer
 Wal Rigney (1898–1965), Australian rugby union footballer
 Wal Wallace, pro-wrestler ring name of Pierre Carl Ouellet (born 1967)
 Wal Walmsley (1916–1978), Australian cricketer

Australian-rules football players
 Wal Alexander (1923–1995), Australian-rules footballer
 Wal Allan, Australian-rules footballer
 Wal Armour (1921–1995), Australian-rules footballer
 Wal Burleigh (1886–1948), Australian-rules footballer
 Wal Dudley (1918–1978), Australian-rules footballer and cricketer
 Wal Gillard (1874–1931), Australian-rules footballer
 Wal Gunnyon (1895–1972), Australian-rules footballer
 Wal Heron (1875–1936), Australian-rules footballer
 Wal Jenkins (1897–1978), Australian-rules footballer
 Wal Johnson (1913–1999), Australian-rules footballer
 Wal McGrath (1910–1999), Australian-rules footballer
 Wal McKenzie (1879–1931), Australian-rules footballer
 Wal Matthews (1894–1973), Australian-rules footballer
 Wal Riddington (1893–1954), Australian-rules footballer
 Wal Rogers (1889–1965), Australian-rules footballer
 Wal Romari (1907–1962), Australian-rules footballer
 Wal Smallhorn (1881–1968), Australian-rules footballer
 Wal Warren (1876–1942), Australian-rules footballer
 Wal Williams (1904–1982), Australian-rules footballer

Others
 Wal Campbell (1906–1979), Australian journalist
 Wal Cherry (1932–1986), Australian stage theatre artist
 Wal Fife (1929–2017), Australian politician
 Wal Hannington (1896–1966), British politician and labour activist
 Wal McDonald, British gangster
 Wal Murray (1931–2004), Australian politician
 Wal Pink (1862—1922), British theatre performer
 Wal Sargent (1935–2012), British-American astronomer
 Wal Torres (born 1950), Brazilian gender therapist

Fictional characters
 Wallace Cadwallader "Wal" Footrot, the main character in the Footrot Flats comic strip
 Wal Rus, a Marvel Comics character, a fictional anthropomorphic walrus

See also

 Wal (disambiguation)